Urfi Shirazi (1555–1591) was a Persian poet.

Urfi or Orfi may also refer to:

 Nikah 'urfi, a system of Islamic marriage
 Adjective form of Urf (customary non-Shariah law in Muslim societies)

See also
 Ofra
 Orfi (disambiguation)